A dog whistle (also known as silent whistle or Galton's whistle) is a type of whistle that emits sound in the ultrasonic range, which humans cannot hear but some other animals can, including dogs and domestic cats, and is used in their training. It was invented in 1876 by Francis Galton and is mentioned in his book Inquiries into Human Faculty and Its Development, in which he describes experiments to test the range of frequencies that could be heard by various animals, such as a house cat.

The upper limit of the human hearing range is about 20 kilohertz (kHz) for children, declining to 15–17 kHz for middle-age adults.  The top end of a dog's hearing range is about 45 kHz, while a cat's is 64 kHz.  It is thought that the wild ancestors of cats and dogs evolved this higher hearing range in order to hear high-frequency sounds made by their preferred prey, small rodents. The frequency of most dog whistles is within the range of 23 to 54 kHz, so they are above the range of human hearing, although some are adjustable down into the audible range.

To human ears, a dog whistle makes only a quiet hissing sound.  The advantage of the dog whistle is that it doesn't produce a loud irritating noise for humans that a normal whistle would produce, so it can be used to train or command animals without disturbing nearby people. Some dog whistles have adjustable sliders for active control of the frequency produced. Trainers may use the whistle simply to gather a dog's attention, or to inflict pain for the purpose of behaviour modification.

In addition to lung-powered whistles, there are also electronic dog whistle devices that emit ultrasonic sound via piezoelectric emitters.  The electronic variety are sometimes coupled with bark-detection circuits in an effort to curb barking behaviour. This kind of whistle can also be used to determine the hearing range for people and for physics demonstrations requiring ultrasonic sounds.

See also 
 Dog whistle (politics)
 Infrasound
 Ultrasound

References

External links 
 

Whistle
Whistle
Whistles

cs:Galtonova píšťala